Musiikkituottajat – IFPI Finland ry, or Musiikkituottajat for short (formerly known as Suomen Ääni- ja kuvatallennetuottajat; ÄKT), IFPI Finland in English, is the umbrella organization of recording producers active in Finland, with 23 record labels as its members.

Activity
The aim of the association is "to improve the cultural-political situation and legal protections of record production, develop the distribution and production of recordings and music videos and participate in governing and overseeing the production rights". Musiikkituottajat is the Finnish representative of the International Federation of the Phonographic Industry (IFPI). It is also one of the three member associations of Gramex.

Since 1994, Musiikkituottajat has been responsible for composing the official records chart, the Official Finnish Charts. The list was produced in cooperation with the Finnish Broadcasting Company (Yleisradio) until late 2009. The association governs the ISRC codes used in Finland and it also keeps account of the best-selling recordings of all time in Finland and awards acts with the gold and platinum certifications (below).

Certification
In certifying recordings sold in Finland, Musiikkituottajat takes into account both physical and digital sales. The certifications awarded by Musiikkituottajat and their sales limits are the following:

Albums 
Gold: 10,000
Platinum: 20,000
Double platinum: 40,000
Triple platinum: 60,000
(etc.)

Note: Domestic albums use the current threshold for albums released on or after January 1, 2010. For foreign albums, the threshold was used for albums released on or after January 1, 2008. Double, triple and multi-platinum award levels were introduced in 1989.

Singles, EPs and DVDs 
Gold: 5,000
Platinum: 10,000
Double platinum: 20,000
(etc.)

Video certifications was introduced in June 2004. For extended plays, it uses the current thresholds, for releases on or after January 1, 2010.

Certification levels (timeline) 

Music recording certification was introduced in Finland in September 1971.

Albums 

Gold

Platinum

Diamond

Singles 

Gold

Platinum

List of albums certified by Musiikkituottajat

Gold

2nd to None
Aerial (album)
Alone
Animalize
Appetite for Destruction
Artpop
...Baby One More Time
Ballbreaker
Believe
The Best of 1980–1990
The Best of 1990–2000
The Best of Sade
Best Of – Volume I
The Big Picture
Blow Up Your Video
Born This Way
Bridge Over Troubled Water
Cieli di Toscana
Crazy Love
Crazy Nights
Everything Changes
Europop
Forty Licks
Greatest Hits (Bon Jovi)
The Greatest Hits (Cher)
Happiness
Incanto
Indestructible
Innuendo (album)
Ixnay on the Hombre
J.Lo
Led Zeppelin Remasters
Legend
Live Summer 2003
Love. Angel. Music. Baby.
A Medio Vivir
The Memory of Trees
Mercury Falling
The Miracle
Monster
Mothership
My Christmas
Nevermind
A Night at the Opera
Not That Kind
On How Life Is
Only by the Night
Oral Fixation Vol. 2
Paint the Sky with Stars
Piece of Mind
Pitkä ihana leikki
Playing the Angel
Private Dancer
Le Roi est mort, vive le Roi!
Reality Killed The Video Star
Romanza
Screamworks: Love in Theory and Practice
The Silent Force
The Soul Cages
Sing When You're Winning
Spirits Having Flown
Steal This Album!
Stiff Upper Lip
Stilelibero
Supposed Former Infatuation Junkie
Talk on Corners
Ten Summoner's Tales
Time to Say Goodbye
Toto IV
Totuutta ja tehtävää
Tra te e il mare
Unplugged (Eric Clapton)
Venus Doom
Vuelve
Working on a Dream

Platinum

1
21st Century Breakdown
Americana
Amore
Anastacia
...And Justice for All
And Love Said No: The Greatest Hits 1997–2004
Back for Good
Back to Black
The Best of Laura Pausini: E ritorno da te
By the Way
Dangerous
Dark Light
Deep Shadows and Brilliant Highlights
Escapology
Fallen
The Fame
Freak of Nature
Funhouse
Greatest Hits (Robbie Williams)
Greatest Lovesongs Vol. 666
Green Eyed Soul
Hybrid Theory
I Need You
Ihmisten edessä
The Immaculate Collection
Infinite
Intensive Care
Iron Man 2
LOL
The Long Play
Love Metal
Made in Heaven
Make It Big
Meikit, ketjut ja vyöt
Mi Sangre
No Angel
The Razors Edge
ReLoad
Rudebox
Se ei olekaan niin
Spice
Survivor
The Simon and Garfunkel Collection: 17 of Their All-Time Greatest Recordings
These Days
Tragic Kingdom
True Blue
Use Your Illusion I
Van Halen
Viva la Vida or Death and All His Friends
X&Y

Double Platinum

21
Aquarium
Born in the U.S.A.
Brothers in Arms
Cross Road
Ei
The Eminem Show
Gold: Greatest Hits
Hijas del Tomate
Jagged Little Pill
Let's Talk About Love
Metallica
Razorblade Romance
Something to Remember
Spiceworld
Vapaa ja yksin

Triple or more Platinum

Kun valaistun
Laundry Service
Load
Nightwish
Wishmaster
Imaginaerum
Dark Passion Play
Once
Seili
Strike!

History 
The organization was established in 1970 under the name Äänilevytuottajat ("Sound Record Producers"). Before 1970, the companies in the industry were unionized in Soitinalan Tuottajaliitto ("Organization of Musical Instrument Producers"). In 1982, the organization took the name Suomen Ääni- ja kuvatallennetuottajat ÄKT, which became the current Musiikkituottajat on August 26, 2010.

Events

Musiikkituottajat organizes the following annual events:
 Emma Awards for the most successful artists and professionals of the year
 Muuvi Awards for the best music videos of the year

In addition, Musiikkituottajat organized the JANNE Awards for the best productions in classical music. The awards were cancelled in 2002 and since 2006, the awards have been incorporated in the Emma Awards.

Management

Activities directors
Arto Alaspää 1975–2009
Lauri Rechardt 2010–present

Board
 the board includes:
 Chairperson: Niko Nordström (Warner Music)
 Vice Chairperson: Epe Helenius (Sound of Finland)
Members:
 Jarkko Nordlund (Ratas Music Group)
 Joose Berglund (Universal Music Group)
 Juha Ruuska (Stupido Records)
 Kimmo Valtanen (KSF Entertainment Group)
 Markku Takkunen (Sony Music Entertainment)
 Tapio Korjus (EMI)
 Tom Pannula (Rockadillo, IndieCo)
 Playground Music Bam

See also 
The Official Finnish Charts

References

External links 
 the official homepage of Musiikkituottajat

Music organisations based in Finland
Music industry associations